Piotr Kowalczyk (born June 25, 1986), better known under his stage name Tau, and formerly as Medium, is a Polish rapper, vocalist, beatboxer and hip-hop producer. In 2008, he released his underground debut album Seans spirytystyczny (Séance) under the name Medium. His next underground album Alternatywne źródło energii (Alternative Energy Source) was released in 2010, which helped Medium to be spotted by Marcin "Tytus" Grabski, CEO of Asfalt Records, who offered him a contract.

On November 22, 2011, Tau released his official debut album (performing as Medium) titled Teoria równoległych wszechświatów (The Theory of Parallel Universes), which, despite slight promotion, sold over eight thousand copies in Poland.

In 2012, Tau announced that he had converted to Christianity. A few months later he released his second album Graal (Holy Grail). The album was highly criticized by many reviewers due to its radical lyrics. In 2013, Medium and producer Galus formed a one-album-group Egzegeza. The album Księga słów (The Book of Words) was released on June 28, 2013, in a limited number of copies.

On December 6, 2013, Medium announced that he had changed his pseudonym to Tau due to the fact that his name Medium may have been seen as connected to mediumship practice, which is in opposition to Christian philosophy. A few days later, on December 13, 2013, he declared that he left Asfalt Records in order to form his own label, Bozon Records.

On December 3, 2014, Tau released his first studio album under his new name, titled Remedium. The album peaked at #4 on the OLiS chart, having sold over fifteen thousand copies.

On August 10, 2015, Tau posted a picture on his Facebook profile with a caption that he had finished making a new album. A few days later he said that it is almost sure that the album would be released in November 2015. On October 21, 2015, Tau revealed that his new project was to be titled Restaurator and it was going to be released on December 15, 2015. On December, 2015, Tau said he also was writing an autobiography entitled "Odszukany" (pol. Found),<ref>{{cite web|title=Tau napisze autobiografię. Będzie nosiła tytuł ,,Odszukany  wMeritum.pl|url=http://wmeritum.pl/tau-napisze-autobiografie-bedzie-nosila-tytul-odszukany/131583|website=wMeritum.pl|accessdate=8 January 2017|language=pl-PL|date=31 December 2015}}</ref> yet not release data was set.

In 2016, Tau stopped touring, saying that he wanted to focus on his new project that he had been working on for a while. On January 8, 2017, a single entitled "ON" was released which was to announce a new album and launching a new charitable foundation, both known as On. On February 28, 2017, the second single "Newsletter" was released. ON was eventually released on May 26, 2017, as a double album, which was divided into two parts entitled "On" and "Off". The album debuted at #1 on the OLiS chart.

In 2018, the rapper said that his next album would be released. In December 2018, he posted a message saying that the album would be named Egzegeza: Księga Pszczół (Exegesis: The Book of Bees) and presented its cover. On January 9, 2019, the first single "Ul. Znaków zapytania" was released and the official pre-order was launched, and the rapper announced that the project would be released on March 1.

 Discography 

 Alternatywne źródło energii (2010)
 Teoria równoległych wszechświatów (2011)
 Graal (2012)
 Egzegeza: Księga Słów (2013)
 Remedium (2014)
 Restaurator (2015)
 On (2017)
 Egzegeza: Księga Pszczół (2019)
 Ikona'' (2020)

References 

1986 births
Living people
Hip hop record producers
Polish rappers
Beatboxers
Polish keyboardists
Polish Roman Catholics
Performers of Christian hip hop music
Musicians from Kielce